Jonathan N.C. Hill is a British academic in the Defence Studies Department at King’s College London based at the UK’s Joint Services Command and Staff College.

Hill specializes in postcolonialism and in the Maghreb.

Books
Hill is the author of:
Identity in Algerian Politics: The Legacy of Colonial Rule (2009)
Nigeria since Independence: Forever Fragile (2012)
Democratisation in the Maghreb (2016)

References

Academics of King's College London
Islam and politics
Living people
Year of birth missing (living people)